Kukkuyanovo (Kükquyan) is a rural locality (a selo) and the administrative centre of Kukkuyanovsky Selsoviet, Dyurtyulinsky District, Bashkortostan, Russia. The population was 708 as of 2010. There are 8 streets.

Geography 
Kukkuyanovo is located 25 km south of Dyurtyuli (the district's administrative centre) by road. Imay-Utarovo is the nearest rural locality.

References 

Rural localities in Dyurtyulinsky District